Edwin M. Wold (August 8, 1900 – August 9, 1987) was an American businessman and politician.

Wold was born un Minneapolis, Minnesota. He went to Dunwoody College of Technology and to the Little Falls Business College in Little Falls, Minnesota. Wold lived in Aitkin, Minnesota with his wife and family and was the owner of the Wold Implement Company. He served in the Minnesota House of Representatives in 1963 and 1964. Wold died at the Aitkin Community Hospital in Aitkin, Minnesota. The funeral and burial was in Aitkin, Minnesota.

References

1900 births
1987 deaths
People from Aitkin, Minnesota
Businesspeople from Minneapolis
Politicians from Minneapolis
Members of the Minnesota House of Representatives